Tales of Wells Fargo is an American western television series starring Dale Robertson that ran from 1957 to 1962 on NBC. Produced by Revue Productions, the series aired in a half-hour format until its final season when it expanded to an hour and switched from black and white to color.

Series overview

Episodes

Season 1 (1957)
Season 1 consisted of 30 minute episodes in black & white, airing 8:30–9:00 on Monday nights.

Season 2 (1957–58)
Season 2 consisted of 30 minute episodes in black & white, airing 8:30–9:00 on Monday nights.

Season 3 (1958–59)
Season 3 consisted of 30 minute episodes in black & white, airing 8:30–9:00 on Monday nights.

Season 4 (1959–60)
Season 4 consisted of 30 minute episodes in black & white, airing 8:30–9:00 on Monday nights.

Season 5 (1960–61)
Season 5 consisted of 30 minute episodes in black & white, airing 8:30–9:00 on Monday nights.

Season 6 (1961–62)
In season 6, the show converted to 60 minute episodes in color, and moved to a Saturday night 7:30–8:30 time slot.

References

External links
 
 
 1957 ratings at classictvhits.com
 1958 ratings at classictvhits.com

Lists of American Western (genre) television series episodes